Pedro Miguel Estrela Duarte (born 22 March 1973) is a retired Portuguese football midfielder.

References

1973 births
Living people
Portuguese footballers
S.C. Olhanense players
S.C. Braga players
Leça F.C. players
C.F. Os Belenenses players
Portimonense S.C. players
Atlético Clube de Portugal players
Lusitano F.C. (Portugal) players
S.C. Farense players
O Elvas C.A.D. players
Association football midfielders
Primeira Liga players